The Uganda Cup is Uganda's main national cup competition in football. This annual competition is open for member clubs of the Federation of Uganda Football Associations.

The Uganda Cup is  the second most prestigious competition in Uganda football.

It is played on a knock out basis. This annual competition is open for non league sides, registered clubs playing in all the five football divisions (Div I, II, III, IV and V) of  the Federation of Uganda Football Associations (FUFA)

Background
The Uganda Cup was first held in 1971.  The current holders are BUL FC who won the cup by defeating VIPERS SC 3-1 on 12 June 2022 in Masindi district.  Express FC and KCCA FC now hold holds the record number of wins with 10 cup titles, followed by SC Villa who have won 9 titles.

The winner of the competition represents Uganda in the CAF Confederations Cup and CECAFA Nile Basin Cup Winners Cup (maiden edition 2014).

Current competition

The 2013-14 Uganda Cup preliminary rounds were played in December 2013 and January 2014 and are organised on a regional basis. On 7 February 2014 Big League side Sadolin Paints kick off the Round of 64 in the 2013/2014 Uganda Cup  with a game against Super League Police FC. This stage of the competition will be completed by 21 February 2014.

List of cup winners

Performance by club

References

External links
Uganda - List of Cup Finals, RSSSF.com

Football competitions in Uganda
National association football cups
Recurring sporting events established in 1971